The 1920 Trinity Blue and White football team was an American football team that represented Trinity College (later renamed Duke University) as an independent during the 1920 college football season. In its first and only season under head coach Floyd J. Egan, the team compiled a 4–0–1 record. B. B. Jones was the team captain.

Schedule

References

Trinity
Duke Blue Devils football seasons
College football undefeated seasons
Trinity Blue and White football